Liberty High School is a large urban, public high school located in Bethlehem, Pennsylvania. Liberty is the larger of two public high schools in the Bethlehem Area School District; Freedom High School is the other. Liberty's current attendance area includes students from the City of Bethlehem, Fountain Hill, Freemansburg, and Hanover Township. As of the 2021-22 school year, the school had an enrollment of 2,702 students, according to National Center for Education Statistics data.

Liberty High School students may choose to attend the Bethlehem Area Vocational-Technical School for training in the construction and mechanical trades. In 2015, the Bethlehem School District reported that over 1,000 Bethlehem Area pupils were enrolled in the Vocational school's programs. The Colonial Intermediate Unit IU20 provides the school with a wide variety of services like: specialized education for disabled students; state mandated training on recognizing and reporting child abuse; speech and visual disability services; criminal background check processing for prospective employees and professional development for staff and faculty.

Liberty High School holds football games and other sporting events at the Frank Banko Field at the Bethlehem Area School District Stadium, one of the largest high school football stadiums in the state. Graduation takes place annually at Stabler Arena.

History
Liberty High School was built in 1918 and opened in 1922. At the ceremony in May 1923, Liberty High School was dedicated to "the progressive spirit of the citizens of Bethlehem." At the opening of the school, Liberty was seen as "one of the greatest achievements of the City of Bethlehem," and designed to not only "further the well-being of youth" but also to stand as a "War Memorial, commemorating the valor of Bethlehem men who went to the front, the sacrifice of the heroic dead and the manifold contributions and productions of the city toward bringing the war to swift and just conclusion." Liberty High School was given its name to cement this War Memorial status.  It is located in the geographical center of Bethlehem, Pennsylvania, in the Lehigh Valley region of the state.

Liberty High School served all of Bethlehem until Freedom High School was built. Following the opening of Freedom High School, Center City, Pembroke, and South Side residents in Bethlehem attended Liberty while Bethlehem Township and Hanover Township residents went to Freedom. Adjustments have since been made to these borders, and Liberty now has students from Hanover, Center City, Pembroke and some of South Side (with some South Side residents attending the Freedom school).

Up until Liberty's recent remodel, the school was composed of three classroom buildings, two buildings with four floors and one science center with two. Over the years, several renovations have been performed on the school, with the most recent being an overhaul of the main building, along with the construction of a new student activity center.

Liberty High School's Main building (Common's Building) is currently home to the Freshman Center. It is a new program established in 2013 meant to help freshmen make the transition the high school a little easier. Students there are now following a different schedule than the 10-12 graders attending Liberty. All freshmen take classes in the 2nd and 3rd floor of the commons building and travel for gym, business and sciences classes. It was developed due to the fact that freshmen typically struggle academically with such a big transition from middle school. This is the first time Liberty High School has done something like this in its history.

Athletics

The school's athletic teams compete in the Eastern Pennsylvania Conference, one of the premier high school athletic conferences in the nation that also includes high schools from Allentown, Easton, Emmaus, and other Lehigh Valley locations.

Liberty High School sports include cheerleading (non-competitive and competitive), baseball, field hockey, boys and girls soccer, boys and girls track and field, boys and girls basketball, football, softball, boys and girls volleyball, Co-ed golf, boys and girls swimming, rifle, boys and girls tennis, girls and boys lacrosse, wrestling, and boys and girls cross country. In December 2008, the Liberty High School varsity football team won the Pennsylvania 4A State Championship. Liberty High School has the fifth most Eastern Pennsylvania Conference championships in all sports, behind Parkland High School, Emmaus High School, Easton Area High School, and Allentown Central Catholic High School.

Liberty High School (as well as Freedom High School and Bethlehem Catholic High School) plays at Frank Banko Field at Bethlehem Area School District Stadium, a 12,000 capacity high school stadium that is one of the largest in Pennsylvania.

In 2022, Liberty High School's baseball team placed second in Pennsylvania's state tournament for 6A teams.

Grenadier Band
The Liberty High School Grenadier Band is the official marching band of the school. The band is unique in that is uses the format for military bands in the British Army's Household Division, a format it began using in 1967. Since then, it has been adapted and made suitable for the American high school marching bands with the addition of Sousaphones, Mellophones, Baritone horns and fewer trumpets. The band was originally founded as the Bethlehem High School Band in 1926. At that time, the school was one of its kind since it opened in 1922. After the school's name change in 1966, the band began to orient itself towards the Coldstream Guards by issuing new uniforms and creating a pipe band, which itself resembles the Scots Guards. As of 2019, the LHSGB consists of 300 students which, besides the bagpipe section, also includes a color guard section, majorettes, corps of drums, fanfare trumpeters, and a drum major.

The Grenadier Band was featured in a 2016 PBS39 documentary, Second to None: Liberty High School Grenadier Band. The documentary follows the historic legacy of the band, as well as the process by which the band conducts itself every year.

Notable alumni

David Bader, computer scientist and professor, Georgia Institute of Technology
Thomas Baron, former Apollo 1 whistleblower
Chuck Bednarik, former professional football player, Philadelphia Eagles, Pro Football Hall of Fame member, responsible for The Hit, one of the most famed plays in NFL history
John B. Callahan, former mayor of Bethlehem, Pennsylvania
Pete Carril, former basketball coach, Princeton University, Basketball Hall of Fame member
Alexandra Chando, actress, CBS's As the World Turns and ABC's The Lying Game
Jimmy DeGrasso, drummer, Alice Cooper band; former drummer, Megadeth
Ted Deutch, former U.S. Congressman
Martin C. Faga, former director, National Reconnaissance Office
Peter Feaver, former special advisor for strategic planning and institutional reform, U.S. National Security Council
Jonathan Frakes, actor and director, William Riker in Star Trek: The Next Generation
Murray H. Goodman, real estate developer
Erica Grow, meteorologist, WPIX in New York City
Mike Hartenstine, former professional football player, Chicago Bears and Minnesota Vikings
Darrun Hilliard, professional basketball player with Maccabi Tel Aviv, formerly with Detroit Pistons and San Antonio Spurs
Loren Keim, real estate author and magazine editor
Gary Lavelle, former professional baseball player, Oakland Athletics, San Francisco Giants and Toronto Blue Jays
Barry W. Lynn, political activist and former executive director, Americans United for Separation of Church and State
Zora Martin-Felton, former education director, Smithsonian Institution
J. J. Maura, former voiceover artist and television announcer, WCAU and QVC
Matt McBride, former professional baseball player, Colorado Rockies and Oakland Athletics
Paul McHale, former assistant secretary of Defense for Homeland Security and former Member of Congress
Billy Packer, former college basketball television sportscaster, CBS Sports
Dan Persa, former quarterback for the Northwestern Wildcats and finished his college career with the highest completion percentage in the NCAA 
James J. Reed, former head coach, United States men's national soccer team
Thom Schuyler, country music songwriter, Nashville Songwriters Hall of Fame
Bill Shuey, outside linebackers coach, Jacksonville Jaguars
Sheetal Sheth, actress, Looking for Comedy in the Muslim World
Devin Street, former professional football player, Dallas Cowboys, Houston Texans, Indianapolis Colts, New England Patriots, and New York Jets 
David Zinczenko, diet author, editor of Men's Health magazine

Notable faculty
James Delgrosso, former mayor of Bethlehem, Pennsylvania

References

External links
Official website
Liberty High School athletics
Liberty High School on Facebook
Liberty High School on Twitter
Liberty High School profile at U.S. News & World Report
Liberty High School sports coverage at The Express-Times

1922 establishments in Pennsylvania
Bethlehem, Pennsylvania
Educational institutions established in 1922
Public high schools in Pennsylvania
Schools in Lehigh County, Pennsylvania
Schools in Northampton County, Pennsylvania